The Naval General Service Medal can refer to one of two medals, each issued by the British government as campaign medals for naval service:

Naval General Service Medal (1847) -  authorised in 1847, awarded for a range of naval actions, from full-scale battles to minor skirmishes, between the period 1793–1840.
Naval General Service Medal (1915) - instituted in 1915, intended to cover minor actions for which a full campaign medal would not have been issues.

In 1962, the British government authorised a new medal, the General Service Medal (1962), which replaced both the Naval General Service Medal and the Army and RAF equivalent — the General Service Medal (1918).